Randy Watts (born June 22, 1963) is a former American football defensive end in the National Football League for the Dallas Cowboys. He played college football at Catawba College.

Early years
Watts attended Washington County High School, in Sandersville, Georgia, where he participated in football, basketball, and track. He led the football team in receiving in his last three seasons.

He accepted a football scholarship from East Carolina University. He was a reserve defensive end in his first two seasons. As a junior, he transferred to NAIA Catawba College, where he was named a starter at defensive tackle, registering 99 tackles and 7.5 sacks. As a senior, he was moved to defensive end, posting 66 tackles and 5 sacks.

Professional career

Kansas City Chiefs (first stint)
Watts was selected by the Kansas City Chiefs in the 9th round (244th overall) of the 1987 NFL Draft. He was waived on September 7.

Dallas Cowboys
After the NFLPA strike was declared on the third week of the 1987 season, those contests were canceled (reducing the 16 game season to 15) and the NFL decided that the games would be played with replacement players. He signed to be a part of the Dallas replacement team that was given the mock name "Rhinestone Cowboys" by the media. He had 7 tackles, one fumble recovery and 3 sacks (tied for the team lead) in 3 games. He was waived in November.

In 1988, he was re-signed to participate in training camp. He was released on August 18.

Kansas City Chiefs (second stint)
In 1989, he was signed as a free agent by the Kansas City Chiefs. He was released on August 29.

Atlanta Falcons
In 1990, he was signed by the Atlanta Falcons as a free agent. He was released on August 28.

References

1963 births
Living people
People from Sandersville, Georgia
Players of American football from Georgia (U.S. state)
American football defensive ends
East Carolina Pirates football players
Catawba Indians football players
Dallas Cowboys players
National Football League replacement players